This is an incomplete list of topics relating to the intellectual traditions of Austria.

Austrian culture
Austromarxism
German philosophy
Austrian School of Economics
Vienna Circle
Vienna School of Art History

People
List of German-language philosophers
Alexius Meinong
Carl Gustav Jung
Sigmund Freud
Ludwig Wittgenstein
Ludwig von Mises

Periods

Sturm und Drang
German Romanticism

Austrian culture
Austria-related lists